Ezekiel 35 is the thirty-fifth chapter of the Book of Ezekiel in the Hebrew Bible or the Old Testament of the Christian Bible. This book contains the prophecies attributed to the prophet/priest Ezekiel, and is one of the Books of the Prophets. This chapter contains a prophecy against Mount Seir in Edom, to the south of Judah. Biblical commentator Susan Galambush pairs it with an oracle promising "restoration to the mountains of Israel" in the following chapter.

Text
The original text was written in the Hebrew language. This chapter is divided into 15 verses.

Textual witnesses
Some early manuscripts containing the text of this chapter in Hebrew are of the Masoretic Text tradition, which includes the Codex Cairensis (895), the Petersburg Codex of the Prophets (916), Aleppo Codex (10th century), and Codex Leningradensis (1008). Fragments containing parts of this chapter were found among the Dead Sea Scrolls, that is, the Ezekiel Scroll from Masada (Mas 1d; MasEzek; 1–50 CE) with extant verses 11–15.

There is also a translation into Koine Greek known as the Septuagint, made in the last few centuries BC. Extant ancient manuscripts of the Septuagint version include Codex Vaticanus (B; B; 4th century), Codex Alexandrinus (A; A; 5th century) and Codex Marchalianus (Q; Q; 6th century).

Verse 2
 "Son of man, set your face against Mount Seir and prophesy against it" (NKJV)
 "Son of man" (Hebrew: בן־אדם -): this phrase is used 93 times to address Ezekiel.
The motivation for locating a second, more vehement condemnation here is obscure.

Verse 10
Because you have said, ‘These two nations and these two countries shall be mine, and we will possess them’, although the Lord was there.
This verse suggests that the Edomites planned to take possession of the promised land, Israel and Judah, following the Israelites' deportation to Babylon.

Verse 15
 As you rejoiced because the inheritance of the house of Israel was desolate, so I will do to you;
 you shall be desolate, O Mount Seir, as well as all of Edom—all of it!
 Then they shall know that I am the Lord.”’ (NKJV)
Cross reference: ;

See also

Edom
Israel
Mount Seir
Related Bible parts: Genesis 36, Isaiah 34, Jeremiah 49, Lamentations 4, Ezekiel 25, Obadiah

Notes

References

Bibliography

External links

Jewish
Ezekiel 35 Hebrew with Parallel English
Ezekiel 35 Hebrew with Rashi's Commentary

Christian
Ezekiel 35 English Translation with Parallel Latin Vulgate

35